Pedestal Software was a company specializing in computer security founded in 1996 by Fernando Trias and Keith Woodard and sold to Altiris in 2005 for $65 million. It was headquartered in Newton, Massachusetts with satellite offices in San Francisco, Chicago and London. It was funded by the founders, Venrock and 3i and employed over 50 people when it was sold. Altiris was later acquired by Symantec.

References

Defunct software companies of the United States
3i Group companies